Mount Desert Island (MDI) in Hancock County, Maine, is the largest island off the coast of Maine. With an area of  it is the 52nd-largest island in the United States, the sixth-largest island in the contiguous United States, and the second-largest island on the Eastern Seaboard, behind Long Island and ahead of Martha's Vineyard. According to the 2010 census, the island has a year-round population of 10,615. In 2017, an estimated 3.5 million tourists visited Acadia National Park on MDI. The island is home to numerous well-known summer colonies such as Northeast Harbor and Bar Harbor.

Origin of the name
Some residents stress the second syllable in the French fashion, while others pronounce it like the English common noun desert. French explorer Samuel de Champlain's observation that the summits of the island's mountains were free of vegetation as seen from the sea led him to call the island  (meaning island of barren mountains).

Towns and villages
There are four towns on Mount Desert Island:
 Bar Harbor, with the villages of Eden, Hulls Cove, Salisbury Cove, and Town Hill;
 Mount Desert, with the villages of Hall's Quarry, Northeast Harbor, Otter Creek, Pretty Marsh, Seal Harbor, and Somesville;
 Southwest Harbor, with the villages of Manset and Seawall;
 Tremont, with the villages of Bass Harbor, Bernard, Gotts Island, Seal Cove, and West Tremont.

History

Deep shell heaps indicate Native American encampments dating back 6,000 years in Acadia National Park, but prehistoric data is scant. The first written descriptions of the indigenous tribes of the Maine coast, recorded 100 years after European trade contacts began, describe people who lived off the land by hunting, fishing, collecting shellfish, and gathering plants and berries. The Wabanaki knew Mount Desert Island as Pemetic, "the sloping land". They built bark-covered conical shelters, and traveled in exquisitely designed birch bark canoes. Historical notes record that the Wabanaki wintered in interior forests and spent their summers near the coast. Archeological evidence suggests the opposite pattern; in order to avoid harsh inland winters and to take advantage of salmon runs upstream, Native Americans wintered on the coast and summered inland.

French colonial period
The first meeting between the indigenous inhabitants of Pemetic and the Europeans is a matter of conjecture, but it was a Frenchman, Samuel de Champlain, who made the first important contribution to the historical record of Mount Desert Island. Champlain led an expedition from the St. Croix Settlement. He was tasked with exploring the coast in a patache with twelve sailors and two American Indian guides. They were in search of a mythical walled and wealthy American Indian city named Norumbega. On September 6, 1604 the expedition crossed Frenchman Bay and sailed towards Otter Creek, where smoke could be seen rising from an American Indian encampment. During high tide the ship hit a ledge off Otter Cliff and while repairing a hole two American Indians boarded the ship as guides.

It is not clear whether Champlain sailed around the Island or was informed by the guides, but on that day, he wrote in his journal, "Le sommet de la plus part d’icelles est desgarny d’arbres parceque ce ne sont que roches. Je l’ay nommée l’Isle des Monts-déserts", which translates to "Most of the summits are free of trees because they are only rocks present. I named [the island] Isle of the Desert Mountains."

Raid on Mount Desert Island (1613)

In 1613, French Jesuits, welcomed by Indians, established the first French mission in America—Saint Sauveur Mission—on what is now Fernald Point, near the entrance to Somes Sound. Saint Sauveur Mountain, overlooking the point, still bears the name of the mission.

The French missionaries began to build a fort, plant their corn, and baptize the indigenous inhabitants. Two months later, on July 2, 1613, Captain Samuel Argall of the English colony of Virginia arrived on board the Treasurer and destroyed their mission. Three of the missionaries were killed and three were wounded. The rest of the company, some twenty in all, were taken prisoner. Argall took many of the prisoners to Jamestown. He eventually returned to Saint-Sauveur and cut down the cross the Jesuits had planted, replacing it with a Protestant version. He then set fire to the few buildings that were there. He then went on to burn the remaining French buildings on Saint Croix Island and Port Royal, Nova Scotia.

The English raid at Fernald Point signaled the dispute over the boundary between the French colony of Acadia to the north and the English colonies in New England to the south. There is evidence that Claude de La Tour immediately challenged the English action by re-establishing a fur-trading post in the nearby village of Castine in the wake of Argall's raid.

There was a brief period when it seemed Mount Desert would again become a center of French activity. In 1688, Antoine de la Mothe Cadillac, an ambitious young man who had immigrated to New France and bestowed upon himself the title sieur de Cadillac, asked for and received  of land along the Maine coast, including all of Mount Desert Island. Cadillac's hopes of establishing a feudal estate in the New World, however, were short-lived. Although he and his bride resided there for a time, they soon abandoned their enterprise. Cadillac later gained lasting recognition as the founder of Detroit. The island's highest point, at  the highest point on the eastern seaboard of the United States, bears the name Cadillac Mountain, and is notable for the fact that its summit is among the first points in the United States touched by the rays of the rising sun.

Raid on Acadia (1704)

During much of the seventeenth century, nearby Castine was the most southern settlement of Acadia. (Bristol, Maine, was the northernmost English colonial settlement.) No one settled in this contested territory, and for the next 150 years Mount Desert Island's importance to Europeans was primarily its use as a landmark for seamen, as for example when John Winthrop, first governor of the English Massachusetts Bay Colony, sketched the island's mountains on his voyage to the New World.

During Queen Anne's War, in response to the French raid on Deerfield, New Englander Benjamin Church raided the Acadian village of Castine before gathering at Mount Desert Island with other ships to continue with the raid on St. Stephen, raid on Grand Pré, the raid on Piziquid, and the raid on Chignecto.

British colonial period
In 1759, the British Army defeated the French at Quebec, ending France's control over Acadia. This also had the effect of opening lands along the Maine coast opened for settlement by colonists from British North America. The royal governor of Massachusetts, Sir Francis Bernard, obtained a royal land grant on Mount Desert Island. The next year, Bernard attempted to secure his claim by offering free land to colonists. Abraham Somes and James Richardson accepted the offer and settled their families at what is now Somesville.

American Revolution
The onset of the American Revolution ended Bernard's plans for Mount Desert Island. In its aftermath, Bernard, who had sided with the British Crown, lost his claim. Massachusetts, now independent of British rule, granted the western half of Mount Desert Island to John Bernard, son of the governor, who, unlike his father, sided with the Patriots. The eastern half of the island was granted to Marie Therese de Gregoire, granddaughter of Cadillac. Bernard and de Gregoire soon sold their landholdings to nonresident landlords.

Their real estate transactions probably made very little difference to the increasing number of white settlers homesteading on Mount Desert Island. By 1820, when Maine separated from Massachusetts and became a separate state, farming and lumbering vied with fishing and shipbuilding as major occupations. Settlers converted hundreds of acres of trees into wood products ranging from schooners and barns to baby cribs and hand tools. Farmers harvested wheat, rye, corn, and potatoes. By 1850, the familiar sights of fishermen and sailors, fish racks and shipyards, revealed a way of life linked to the sea. Quarrying of granite, which could be cut from hills close to deep water anchorage for shipment to major cities on the east coast, was also a major industry.

Rusticators

It was the outsiders, artists, and journalists who revealed and popularized this island to the world in the mid 19th century. Painters of the Hudson River School, including Thomas Cole and Frederic Church, glorified Mount Desert Island with their brushstrokes, inspiring patrons and friends to flock here. These were the "rusticators". Undaunted by crude accommodations and simple food, they sought out local fishermen and farmers to put them up for a modest fee. Summer after summer, the rusticators returned to renew friendships with local islanders and, most of all, to savor the fresh salt air, scenery, and relaxed pace. Soon the villagers' cottages and fishermen's huts filled to overflowing, and by 1880, 30 hotels competed for vacationers' dollars. Tourism was becoming the major industry.

For a select handful of Americans, the 1880s and the "Gay Nineties" meant affluence on a scale without precedent. Mount Desert, still remote from the cities of the East, became a retreat for prominent people of the time. The Rockefellers, Morgans, Fords, Vanderbilts, Carnegies, and Astors chose to spend their summers here. Not content with the simple lodgings then available, these families transformed the landscape of Mount Desert Island with elegant estates, called "cottages". The landscape architect Beatrix Farrand, at the Cadwalder Rawle - Rhinelander Jones family summer home Reef Point Estate, designed the gardens for many of these people. Projects included the Chinese-inspired garden at "The Eyrie" for Abby Aldrich Rockefeller at Seal Harbor (1926–35), and the planting plans for subtle roads at Acadia National Park sponsored by John D. Rockefeller, Jr. (c.1930). Luxury, refinement, and ostentatious gatherings replaced buckboard rides, picnics, and day-long hikes of an earlier era. Some rusticators also formed "Village Improvement Societies" which constructed hiking trails and walking paths connecting the Island's villages to its interior mountains. For over 40 years, the wealthy held sway at Mount Desert, but the Great Depression and World War II marked the end of such extravagance. The final blow came in 1947 when a fire of monumental proportions consumed many of the great estates.

Acadia National Park

In 1901, George B. Dorr, disturbed by the growing development of the Bar Harbor area and the dangers he foresaw in the newly invented gasoline-powered portable sawmill, established along with others the Hancock County Trustees of Public Reservations. The corporation, whose sole purpose was to preserve land for the perpetual use of the public, acquired  by 1913. Dorr offered the land to the federal government, and in 1916, President Wilson announced the creation of Sieur de Monts National Monument. Dorr continued to acquire property and renewed his efforts to obtain full national park status for his beloved preserve. In 1919, President Woodrow Wilson signed the act establishing Lafayette National Park, the first national park east of the Mississippi. Dorr, whose labors constituted "the greatest of one-man shows in the history of land conservation", became the first park superintendent. In 1929, the park name was changed to Acadia National Park.

John D. Rockefeller Jr. endowed the park with much of its land area. Like many rusticators, Rockefeller, whose family fortune was derived from the petroleum industry, wanted to keep the island free of automobiles, but local governments allowed the entry of automobiles on the island's roads. These roads were closed to automobiles and included several vistas and stone bridges. About  of these roads are within Acadia National Park and open only to hikers, bicyclists, horseback riders, horse-drawn carriages and cross country skiers.

In 1950, Marguerite Yourcenar and Grace Frick bought a house, "Petite Plaisance", in Northeast Harbor on the island. Yourcenar wrote a large part of her novel Memoires d'Hadrien on the island, and she died there in 1987. Their house is now a museum. Both ladies were cremated and their ashes are buried in the Brookside Cemetery in Somesville.

In 1969, College of the Atlantic, the island's first and only institution of higher education, was established in Bar Harbor.

In 1986, Friends of Acadia, the nonprofit organization that directs private philanthropy and volunteerism for the benefit of Acadia National Park, was founded.

Geology

Mount Desert Island is rich in geological history dating back about 550 million years. The earliest formation on the island is the Ellsworth Schist Formation, which was a sea-floor mud deposit created during the Cambrian period by volcanic ash. During the Ordovician period, the Acadian orogeny — the collision of Laurentia, Gondwanaland, and Avalonia — caused the formation to fold, thrust, and lift above sea level, where later layers were eroded away and the schist was exposed. The Bar Harbor Formation, which is made up predominantly of sands and silts, and Cranberry Island Formation, made up from volcanic ash and magmatic debris, occurred under similar circumstances in the Silurian and Devonian periods, and were deposited on top of the Ellsworth Schist. However, due to less tectonic activity at that time, their deformation was less severe.

Quarrying of granite was historically an important industry.  Orogenic activity during the Devonian period gave Mount Desert Island three granite units: the Cadillac Mountain granite, the fine-grained Somesville granite, and the medium-grained Somesville granite. Surrounding these granites (labeled "DCg" on geologic maps) is a zone of brecciated material, known as DSz (Devonian Shatter Zone).

Most recently, Mount Desert Island was host to the Laurentide Ice Sheet as it extended and receded during the Pleistocene epoch. The glacier left visible marks upon the landscape, such as Bubble Rock, a glacial erratic carried  by the ice sheet from a Lucerne granite outcrop and deposited precariously on the side of South Bubble Mountain in Acadia National Park. Other examples are the moraines deposited at the southern ends of many of the glacier-carved valleys on the Island such as the Jordan Pond valley, indicating the extent of the glacier; and the beach sediments in a regressional sequence beneath and around Jordan Pond, indicating the rebound of the continent after the glacier's recession about 25,000 years ago.

The area around Somes Sound was originally categorized as a fjord and was the only one on the East Coast of North America. It has since been recategorized as a fjard due to the lack of an area of de-oxygenated water (dead zone), as well as the fact that the mountains on either side of the sound are not as steep as is typically expected with a fjord.

Ecology
Excavations of old Indian sites in the Mount Desert Island region have yielded remains of the native mammals. Bones of wolf, North American beaver (Castor canadensis), deer, elk, gray seal (Halichoerus grypus), "Indian dog", and sea mink (Neogale macrodon) have been uncovered, as well as large numbers of raccoon, lynx, muskrat, and deer. Although beaver were trapped to extinction on the island, two pairs of beaver that were released in 1920 by George B. Dorr at the brook between Bubble Pond and Eagle Lake and their descendants have repopulated it. A large fire in 1947 cleared the eastern half of the island of its coniferous trees and permitted the growth of aspen, birch, alder, maple and other deciduous trees which enabled the beaver to thrive.

Art

Transport
The Island Explorer provides seasonal bus service on and near the island, largely to serve visitors to Acadia.

In popular culture
The Far Harbor add-on for the 2015 video game Fallout 4 is set on a 
post-apocalyptic Mount Desert Island. The module draws its name from the game's settlement of Far Harbor, which is in the same location as Bar Harbor in reality.

See also
 Acadia National Park
 List of islands of Maine
 Otter Cliffs Radio Station

References

External links
 
 

 
Conflicts in Nova Scotia
Islands of Hancock County, Maine
Catholic missions of New France
Islands of Maine
Coastal islands of Maine